Feminist Anti-War Resistance (FAR or FAWR) is a group of Russian feminists founded in February 2022 to protest against the 2022 Russian invasion of Ukraine. In its first month, FAR became "one of Russia’s fastest-growing anti-war campaigns", attracting more than 26,000 followers on Telegram.

Manifesto
In a manifesto released on the group's Telegram channel, the group called on feminists around the world to come together to oppose the war launched by Vladimir Putin's government:

An English translation of the manifesto was published in Jacobin, and the manifesto has been translated into almost 30 languages, including Tatar, Chuvash, and Udmurt.

Activities
On 8 March 2022, International Women's Day, Feminist Anti-War Resistance organized the laying of flowers – chrysanthemums and tulips bound with blue and yellow ribbons – by women at war monuments:
 

The protests took place across 94 Russian and international cities, including Saint Petersburg, Moscow, Vladivostok, Yekaterinburg, Novosibirsk, Krasnoyarsk, Kanash, Yaroslavl, Syktyvkar, Smolensk, Luga, Lytkarino, Izhevsk, Volgograd, Irkutsk, Nizhny Novgorod, Ufa, Omsk, Mytishchi, Gelendzhik, Perm, Kazan, Zelenograd, Balashov, Saratov, Biysk, Khimki, Chelyabinsk, Krasnodar, Novovoronezh, Vologda, Korolev, Troitsk, Serpukhov, Vladimir, Revda, Tolyatti, Kaliningrad, Naberezhnye Chelny, Volgodonsk, Ramenskoye, Samara, Leninavan farm, Stavropol, Arkhangelsk, Yoshkar-Ola, Krasnogorsk , Novokuibyshevsk, Zheleznovodsk, Murom, Snegiri, Nakhabino, Rostov-on-Don, Cheboksary, Saransk, Dzerzhinsky, Veliky Novgorod, Tyumen, Tobolsk, Podolsk, Tula, Grebnevo village, Dolgoprudny, Murino, Vladikavkaz and Alagir.

Activists have continued to innovate protest tactics: writing anti-war slogans on banknotes, installing art objects in parks, wearing all black in public as a sign of mourning, handing out flowers, or simply crying in the Moscow metro. As the activist Daria Serenko commented, tactics needed to continue to adapt to evade Russia's crimininalization of protest:

International responses 
On 17 March 2022 151 feminists signed Feminist Resistance Against War: A Manifesto, framing themselves in solidarity with the FAR manifesto and Russian feminist anti-war activity. Signatories included Ailbhe Smyth, Alba Flores, Amaia Pérez Orozco, June Fernández, Keeanga-Yamahtta Taylor, Nancy Fraser, Özlem Demirel, Teresa Rodríguez, Tithi Bhattacharya, Yayo Herrero, Carmen Magallón, Pamela Palenciano, Goretti Horgan, Lidia Cirillo, Zillah R. Eisenstein, Judy Rebick, Ofelia García, El Jones, Shahrzad Mojab, Maristella Svampa, Debora Diniz, Heloísa Helena, Luciana Genro, Sonia Guajajara, Piedad Córdoba Ruiz, Miriam Miranda, Mónica Baltodano, Daria Serenko, Diane Lamoureux, Pamela Philipose, Silvia Federici and Talíria Petrone. The manifesto calls for "a bold redirection of the situation to break the militaristic spiral initiated by Russia and supported by NATO." By the end of March the manifesto had collected over 2,500 signatures. A member of the Feminist Anti-War Resistance later said that the similarly-named manifesto had led to some confusion about their own position, stating, "They advocate for the disarmament of Ukraine. We don’t agree with that and are for arming Ukraine, but [the group’s name] made people think they were writing on behalf of FAR."
On July 7, Commons, the left-wing journal of Ukrainian politics, released a counter-manifesto titled "The right to resist," saying the Feminist Resistance Against War's manifesto had denied Ukrainian women the right to resistance, "which constitutes a basic act of self-defense of the oppressed. We insist on the essential difference between violence as a means of oppression and as a legitimate means of self-defense." The many signatories of the Commons counter-manifesto include the Feminist Anti-War Resistance along with eight named members of the group.

References

External links
 

Resistance during the 2022 Russian invasion of Ukraine
Feminist organizations in Russia
Peace organizations
Organizations established in 2022
Political parties established in 2022
2022 establishments in Russia